This is a list of places in the City and County of Swansea, South Wales

Administrative divisions

Communities

Electoral wards

Towns
Gorseinon
Loughor
Morriston
Pontarddulais
Penllergaer

Prehistoric sites

Geographical

Beaches
There are over seventy named beaches in the Swansea area. Some of the larger beaches have seaside resort amenities and are easily accessible by road.  For those seeking more adventure and tranquility there are some beaches that are only accessible on foot by trekking over cliffs or through farmland.

This is a list of the larger, more well-known beaches:

Rivers and waterways
Blackpill stream
Lower Clydach River
Upper Clydach River
Dulais
Glan-y-wern Canal
River Ilston
Afon Llan
Afon Lliw
River Loughor
River Tawe
Tennant Canal
Swansea Canal

Lakes and reservoirs
Brynmill Park lake
Lake Fendrod
Lower Lliw reservoir
Upper Lliw reservoir

Mountains and Hills
Bryn Carnglas
Cefn Hengoed
Colts Hill
Kilvey Hill
Mumbles Hill
Mynydd-Bach
Mynydd y Betws
Mynydd y Gwair
Townhill

Country parks
Clyne Valley Country Park
Kilvey Community Woodland
Lliw Reservoirs country park
Penllergaer

Nature reserves
Broad Pool
Crymlyn Bog nature reserve
Crymlyn Burrows
Kilvey Community Woodland
Rosehill Quarry
Swansea Vale

Geographical interest
Gower Peninsula
Cefn Bryn
Burry Holms

Retail Parks
Parc Fforestfach, Fforestfach
Morfa Retail Park, Landore
Parc Tawe
Pontarddulais Road Retail Park, Fforestfach
Swansea Enterprise Park

Industrial estates & business parks
Swansea Enterprise Park/Swansea Vale
Swansea West Business Park
Carmarthen Road
Garngoch Industrial Estate, Gorseinon
Gorseinon Business Park, Gorseinon
Kingsbridge Business Park, Gorseinon
Crofty Industrial Estate, Penclawdd
Pontarddulais Estate, Pontarddulais
Players Field Industrial Estate, Clydach
Morfa Industrial Estate, Morfa
Millbrook Yard & Estate, Landore
Morfa Road Industrial Estate, Hafod
SA1 Swansea Waterfront
Penllergaer Business Park, Penllergaer
Felindre

Farmers markets
Clydach Local Produce Market, Clydach (last Saturday each month)
Grovesend Local Producers Market, Grovesend (fourth Saturday each month)
Mumbles Farmers Market, Mumbles (second Saturday each month)
Penclawdd Local Produce Market, Penclawdd (third Saturday each month)
Pontarddulais Local Produce Market, Pontarddulais (second Wednesday each month)
Sketty Local Produce Market, Sketty (first Saturday each month)
Waterfront Local Produce Market, Maritime Quarter (first Sunday each month)

Urban parks
Brymill Park
Cwmdonkin Park, Uplands
Llewellyn Park, Treboeth
Singleton Park, Sketty
Victoria Park

Transport

Primary roads
Fabian Way (A483 road)
M4 motorway (Junctions 44 to 47)

Bus
Gorseinon bus station
Pontarddulais bus station
Swansea bus station

Railway lines
Heart of Wales Line
South Wales Main Line (terminus)
Swansea District Line (freight route)
West Wales Line (terminus)

Railway stations
Gowerton railway station
Llansamlet railway station
Pontarddulais railway station
Swansea railway station

Cycle routes
NCR 4
NCR 43

Shipping
Swansea Docks (Cargo)
Swansea Marina (leisure boats)
River Loughor
River Tawe (leisure boats)

Airports
Swansea Airport

See also
List of places in Wales
List of buildings and structures in Swansea
List of cultural venues in Swansea

References

Swansea-related lists
Swansea